The Ngachen Hydropower Station, also called as Najin Hydropower Station, is the first hydropower plant in the Tibet Autonomous Region since the founding of the People's Republic of China. It is located on a tributary of the Lhasa River,  15 li away from Lhasa. The hydropower station featured six generators and an installed capacity of 7,500 kilowatts.

Ngachen Hydropower Station is the first hydropower station built with the assistance of the Central Committee of the Communist Party of China.

History
In 1957, the Tibet Working Committee of the Communist Party of China (中共西藏工委) and the Tibet Military District decided to excavate the Ngachen Mountain (纳金山) and build Ngachen Hydropower Station. In 1958, the construction of the plant began, and was completed in 1960. 

On April 19, 1960, the plant was completed to generate electricity,  and the ordinary people in Lhasa were able to use electric lights for the first time.

References 

1960 establishments in China
Dams completed in 1960
Dams in China
Energy infrastructure completed in 1960
Hydroelectric power stations in Tibet